Jorge Alexandre Leal das Neves (born 21 December 1969) is a Portuguese football coach and a former player.

Club career
He made his Primeira Liga debut for Beira-Mar on 21 August 1998 in a game against Sporting Braga.

Honours
Beira-Mar
Taça de Portugal: 1998–99

Personal life
His twin brother Rui Neves also played football professionally.

References

External links
 

1969 births
Footballers from Lisbon
Twin sportspeople
Living people
Portuguese footballers
AD Fafe players
S.C. Campomaiorense players
Liga Portugal 2 players
S.C. Beira-Mar players
Primeira Liga players
G.D. Chaves players
Portuguese football managers
S.C. Beira-Mar managers
Association football defenders